Mouillard Glacier is a glacier flowing into the southeast corner of Brialmont Cove, on the west coast of Graham Land, Antarctica. It was photographed by the Falkland Islands and Dependencies Aerial Survey Expedition in 1956–57, and mapped from these photos by the Falkland Islands Dependencies Survey. The glacier was named by the UK Antarctic Place-Names Committee in 1960 for Louis P. Mouillard, a French pioneer of gliding flight.

References

Glaciers of Danco Coast